Coilhouse was an American digital  and print magazine, and corresponding blog. It was founded in 2007 by Nadya Lev, Meredith Yayanos, and Zoetica Ebb., and carries the tagline, "A Love Letter to Alternative Culture." Regular contributors to Coilhouse included Ross Rosenberg, David Forbes, Angeliska Polacheck, and Jeffrey Wengrofsky.

The print and online editions of Coilhouse ended publication in 2012.

References

External links
Official website
Interview with two of the co-founders in LA Weekly Magazine

Visual arts magazines published in the United States
Quarterly magazines published in the United States
Defunct magazines published in the United States
Fashion magazines published in the United States
English-language magazines
Magazines established in 2007
Magazines disestablished in 2012
Magazines published in Los Angeles